The 1998–99 Scottish Second Division was won by Livingston who, along with second placed Inverness Caledonian Thistle, were promoted to the First Division. East Fife and Forfar Athletic were relegated to the Third Division.

Table

Scottish Second Division seasons
Scot
2